Tandooreh National Park is a protected area located in the northeast of Iran, near the city of Dargaz and the Turkmenistan border. The mountainous area features deep valleys and cliffs, with Juniper woodlands on the slopes, and wooded thickets along the rivers in the valleys. Open areas are typically Artemisia steppe.

References

National parks of Iran
Geography of North Khorasan Province
Geography of Razavi Khorasan Province
Tourist attractions in North Khorasan Province
Tourist attractions in Razavi Khorasan Province